Chaogan is a Chinese dish which is especially famous in Beijing.

Chaogan is prepared from pork liver, pork intestine and starch, seasoning with garlic, vinegar and soy sauce. Chaogan is traditionally served with mantou buns.

There is a belief that chaogan was invented in Huixianju restaurant (会仙居), Beijing during the Qing Dynasty.

Although in the name there is the Chinese character "炒" (chao), the dish is not cooked by frying, but boiling, and the name is believed to be derived from the Manchu word "colambi", which means "to cook".

References 

Chinese cuisine
Beijing cuisine
Liver (food)